Macrozafra mariae is a species of marine gastropod mollusc in the family Columbellidae. It was first described by Baden Powell in 1940. It is endemic to the waters of New Zealand.

Description

Macrozafra mariae has a relatively large shell compared to other members of the Macrozafra genus. The shell is ovate and spirally grooved, with weak axial folds. The shell is a full white colour, with the holotype measuring 8.6mm by 4mm.

Distribution
The species is Endemic to New Zealand. The holotype was collected from Cape Maria van Diemen in the Northland Region, New Zealand.

References

Columbellidae
Gastropods described in 1940
Gastropods of New Zealand
Endemic fauna of New Zealand
Endemic molluscs of New Zealand
Molluscs of the Pacific Ocean
Taxa named by Arthur William Baden Powell